Parag Agrawal (born 21 May 1984) is an Indian-American software engineer and businessman who was the CEO of Twitter, Inc. from November 2021 to October 2022. He was fired, along with three other top executives, on October 27, 2022, following Elon Musk's purchase of the company.

Early life and education 
Agrawal was born in Ajmer, Rajasthan. His father was a senior official in the Indian Department of Atomic Energy and his mother is a retired Economics professor from Veermata Jijabai Technological Institute in Mumbai.

In 2001, he completed his final year of higher secondary education at Atomic Energy Junior College, Mumbai. In the same year, he secured a gold medal in the International Physics Olympiad held in Antalya, Turkey.

In 2005, Agrawal obtained his Bachelor of Technology degree in computer science and engineering from IIT Bombay. That year, he moved to the United States to pursue a PhD in computer science at Stanford University under the guidance of Jennifer Widom. His Stanford doctoral thesis, published in 2012, is titled "Incorporating Uncertainty in Data Management and Integration".

Career 
Agrawal held research internships at Microsoft Research and Yahoo! Research before joining Twitter as a software engineer in 2011. In October 2017, Twitter announced the appointment of Agrawal as chief technology officer following the departure of Adam Messinger. In December 2019, Twitter CEO Jack Dorsey announced that Agrawal would be in charge of Project Bluesky, an initiative to develop a decentralized social network protocol. 

On November 29, 2021, Dorsey announced that he was resigning as CEO of Twitter and that Agrawal was replacing him immediately. As CEO, Agrawal was awarded annual compensation of $1 million as well as stock compensation worth $12.5 million. Agrawal was fired as CEO once Elon Musk completed his acquisition of the company on October 27, 2022.

Views and policies 
In an interview with MIT Technology Review in November 2020, when asked about freedom of speech regarding Twitter, Agrawal said: "Our role is not to be bound by the First Amendment, but our role is to serve a healthy public conversation ... [and to] focus less on thinking about free speech, but thinking about how the times have changed."

Personal life
Agrawal is married to Vineeta Agarwala, general partner at the venture capital firm Andreessen Horowitz. They have two children, born in 2018 and 2022. He took paternity leave as the CEO of Twitter for the birth of his second child.

References

External links 
 

1984 births
American chief technology officers
American technology chief executives
Indian emigrants to the United States
IIT Bombay alumni
Living people
People from Ajmer
Stanford University alumni
Twitter, Inc. people